Golden Ladybug of Popularity also often abbreviated as Zlatna bubamara, is a Macedonian popular culture awards show. It is organized by Radio Buba Mara and held annually in Skopje. Since its establishment in 1997, the awards show recognizes the biggest achievements of the year in the field of Macedonian culture and features awards for several categories, including music, films, sports, theater and TV shows among others. 

The 23rd show, held at the Boris Trajkovski Stadium in February 2020 was watched by 55% of the Macedonian population with which it became one of the most watched shows in the country.

History and background
The first ceremony and inauguration of the show was held in 1997 by organizer Ranko Petrovic. The awards show is held annually in the capital of North Macedonia, Skopje. Presenters of the show usually use satire to discuss the socio-political situation in the country and other everyday events. Additionally, performances by music artists and dancers are also part of the show's repertoire.

Awards
During the show, awards are given to the most popular works in several categories related to Macedonian popular culture including achievements in music, films, sports, TV shows and dance. The latest ceremony featured the following categories:

Inclusive Theater Dance Play
Most Popular Child TV Show
Eternal Song
Female Singer of the Year
Male singer of the year
Biggest Hit of the Year
Sport Achievement
Long-lasting Musical Values
Theater Show
Actor of the Year
Actress of the Year
Most Popular Regional Singer
Lifelong Achievement in the Field of Music
Long-lasting Musical Values in Ethno Music
International Award for Lifetime Achievement
Concert
Lifelong Achievement in the Field of Movies
Award for the First Trumpet
Biggest International Success
Ambassadors of Macedonian Culture
Sport Success
Music Producer
TV actress
Most Popular TV Project
Long-lasting Values in Rock Music

See also
Culture of Macedonians (ethnic group)
Macedonian cinema
Music of North Macedonia

References

External links
 

Awards established in 1997
1997 establishments in Europe